Union Slough National Wildlife Refuge, located in Kossuth County, Iowa, was established in 1938 to provide a refuge and breeding ground for waterfowl and other migratory birds. The actual slough is all that remains of a pre-glacial riverbed, and its name is derived from the connection or "union" of two watersheds: the Blue Earth River of Minnesota and the East Fork of the Des Moines River. The terrain is nearly flat, allowing the flow of the water to be determined by the direction of the wind at times.

The refuge is on the eastern edge of the tallgrass prairie region of the Northern Great Plains, an area known for its agriculture. This  refuge surrounded by a sea of corn and soybeans provides vital habitat for a variety of plants and animals dependent upon tallgrass prairie and wetland habitats.

References
Profile of Union Slough National Wildlife Refuge
Refuge website

National Wildlife Refuges in Iowa
Protected areas of Kossuth County, Iowa
Protected areas established in 1938
Wetlands of Iowa
Landforms of Kossuth County, Iowa
1938 establishments in Iowa